Joseph Henry McClean (10 August 1989) is a Programme Development Manager at Prospect Training Services, and a professional rugby league footballer who has played in the 2010s.

Background
McLean was born in Marlborough, Wiltshire, England.

Club career

Hunslet R.L.F.C.
On 3 Mar 2021 it was reported that he had signed for Hunslet R.L.F.C. in the RFL League 1.

International honours
Joe McClean represented Scotland while at Gloucestershire All Golds; he was an interchange/substitute in the 25-4 victory over Ireland in the 2014 European Cup at Tallaght Stadium, Dublin on Saturday 25 October 2014, was an interchange/substitute in the 12-18 defeat by Wales in the 2015 European Cup at Racecourse Ground, Wrexham on Friday 16 October 2015, was an interchange/substitute in the 22-24 defeat by Ireland in the 2015 European Cup at Netherdale, Galashiels on Friday 23 October 2015, and played left-, i.e. number 8, in the 18-32 defeat by France in the 2015 European Cup at Parc des Sports (home of RC Roanne XIII), Roanne on Saturday 7 November 2015.

References

1989 births
Living people
English rugby league players
Gloucestershire All Golds players
Hunslet R.L.F.C. players
Rugby league players from Wiltshire
Rugby league props
Rugby league second-rows
Scotland national rugby league team players
South Wales Scorpions players